The 1992 Furman Paladins football team was an American football team that represented Furman University as a member of the Southern Conference (SoCon) during the 1992 NCAA Division I-AA football season. In their seventh year under head coach Jimmy Satterfield, the Paladins compiled an overall record of 6–5 with a mark of 4–3 in conference play, finishing fifth in the SoCon.

Schedule

References

Furman
Furman Paladins football seasons
Furman Paladins football